Alan Bulman (18 September 1927 – 3 June 1995) was a former Australian rules footballer who played for the Footscray Football Club in the Victorian Football League (VFL).

Footscray 
Bulman, who played his early football with Bacchus Marsh, came to Footscray in 1945.

He spent some time in the second eighteen, before making it into the seniors in the 1948 VFL season, making 12 appearances.

A follower, Bulman was unable to become a regular fixture in the Footscray team, at times troubled by injury.

Later career 
During the 1952 VFA season, Bulman joined Coburg, where he played for two years.

In 1954 he coached Stawell in the Wimmera Football League, then after not being reappointed for 1955 left to coach Navarre.

Notes

External links 
		

1927 births
1995 deaths
Australian rules footballers from Victoria (Australia)
Western Bulldogs players
Coburg Football Club players
Stawell Football Club players